Manyu may refer to:

Manyu (deity)
Manyu (department), Cameroon
Manyu, Banmauk, Burma
Angra Mainyu